Dummy Boy (stylized in all caps) is the debut studio album by American rapper 6ix9ine. It was released on November 27, 2018, but was originally scheduled to be released four days earlier. It follows his debut mixtape, Day69, released earlier in 2018. Dummy Boy features guest appearances from Nicki Minaj, Kanye West, Lil Baby, Gunna, Tory Lanez, A Boogie wit da Hoodie, Anuel AA, TrifeDrew, and Bobby Shmurda, among others.

Dummy Boy was supported by the singles "Tati" featuring DJ Spinking, "Fefe" with Nicki Minaj and Murda Beatz, "Bebe" featuring Anuel AA and "Stoopid" featuring Bobby Shmurda. The album was leaked on 6ix9ine's website on November 24, 2018, and released three days later as a result of the early leaking and at the request of 6ix9ine himself. Despite receiving negative reviews from critics, the album debuted at number two on the US Billboard 200, with 66,000 album-equivalent units earned in three days, and has been certified platinum by the Recording Industry Association of America (RIAA).

Background 
According to 6ix9ine, the album came about when he decided to "put out a project November 23rd" after being in the studio "making hits".

Promotion 
6ix9ine revealed the cover art on November 7, which XXL characterized as 6ix9ine's animated likeness urinating a rainbow. 6ix9ine also previewed a new unnamed track, which HotNewHipHop called "a Jackie Chan-inspired banger" made in collaboration with Scott Storch and Tory Lanez; the song was later revealed to be called "Kika". Several days later, 6ix9ine revealed on Instagram that Nicki Minaj, Lil Baby, Tory Lanez, A Boogie wit da Hoodie, Gunna, Anuel AA and Bobby Shmurda would feature on the album. He later deleted the post, then posted a similar photo revealing Kanye West would be featured on the album.

During the recording of a music video for "Mama" on November 8, 2018, two gunmen shot upon a mansion with West and 6ix9ine present. A bullet went through the dressing room of Nicki Minaj, but she wasn't present at the scene. The music video has since been scrapped.

Release 
On November 7, 2018, 6ix9ine announced that the Dummy Boy album would be released on November 23, 2018.  The album was originally set to be released on November 23, but two days before that date it was announced on 6ix9ine's Instagram that it would be postponed until further notice following his arrest and trial. On November 27, 2018, DJ Akademiks revealed via Twitter that the album would be released on the same day as a result of the early leaking and at the request of 6ix9ine himself. The album was originally supposed to be distributed through Capitol Music Group / Caroline Distribution, but due to an argument stemming from the album's leak, the album was distributed through Create Music Group.

Critical reception 

Dummy Boy received generally negative reviews from music critics, who panned its lyrics, production and Hernandez's performance. At Metacritic, which assigns a normalized rating out of 100 to reviews from mainstream publications, the album received an average score of 38, based on 11 reviews, indicating "generally unfavorable reviews".

Jon Caramanica of The New York Times called the album "energetic but scattered", and less "rowdy" than Day69 due to having softer vocal delivery. He noted that tracks such as "Waka" and "Feefa" seemed to be dominated by the guest artists. Writing for Forbes, Bryan Rolli said that "6ix9ine repeatedly gets shut out by his collaborators and sounds like a visitor on his own album. The young rapper tries to split the difference between his abrasive, streetwise roots and big-budget arena rap spectacle, subsequently failing at both."

Dhruva Balram of NME concluded in his review that "Tekashi has released Dummy Boy at the apex of his fame, but at this stage, he's little more than an internet phenomenon and controversy magnet who also raps. Due to his recent arrest, there's a very real possibility that he will spend the rest of his life in jail. That, hopefully, will give him enough time to release a better project." In a more mixed review, M. Oliver of PopMatters remarked that "What Dummy Boy lacks in maturity and creativity it makes up for in energy and vitriol – equivalently bankable features in 2018."

Commercial performance 
Dummy Boy debuted at number two on the US Billboard 200 with 66,000 album-equivalent units, (of which 10,000 were pure album sales), opening behind Travis Scott's Astroworld on three days of sales, having been released on November 27. It is 6ix9ine's highest-charting album on the chart. On September 4, 2019, the album was certified platinum by the Recording Industry Association of America (RIAA) for combined sales and album-equivalent units of over a million units in the United States.

Track listing 

Notes
 All track titles are stylized in all caps.
 Due to a mispress, the vinyl version does not include "Fefe", instead "Feefa" appears in its place (as well as in its normal placing), making "Feefa" pressed twice on the release.

Personnel 

 6ix9ine – vocals 
 Andres Espana – guitar 
 Murda Beatz – production 
 Scott Storch – production 
 Cubeatz – production ; co-production 
 Tay Keith – production 
 Yung Lan – production 
 Sool Got Hits – production 
 Ronny J – production 
 Ovy on the Drums – production 
 Michael Mora – production 
 Boi-1da – production 
 Take a Daytrip – production 
 Avedon – co-production 
 DJ Spinking – additional production 
 Lee "Wizard Lee" Weinberg – mixing ; mastering ; recording 
 Todd Robinson – mixing, recording 
 Take a Daytrip – mixing, recording

Charts

Weekly charts

Year-end charts

Certifications

References 

2018 debut albums
6ix9ine albums
Albums produced by Boi-1da
Albums produced by Cubeatz
Albums produced by Murda Beatz
Albums produced by Ronny J
Albums produced by Scott Storch
Albums produced by Tay Keith
Albums produced by Take a Daytrip